Kispiox Mountain is the highest mountain in the Kispiox Range of the Hazelton Mountains in northern British Columbia, Canada, located northwest of the junction of Kispiox River and Skeena River.

See also
 List of the most prominent summits of North America

References

Sources

External links
 "Kispiox Mountain, British Columbia" on Peakbagger

Two-thousanders of British Columbia
Hazelton Mountains
Cassiar Land District